Samba Sambero is a 2007 Anna Book studio album.

Track listing
Samba Sambero
Bara för en dag
Jag har sett en främling
Ven a bailar conmigo
Ain't That Just the Way
Lycklig och redo
Kom
Sway
Dansar med kärleken
Andalucia
Natural Woman
ABC
Killsnack
Det finns en morgondag

Chart positions

References

2007 albums
Anna Book albums